Jikjisa (Korean: 직지사; Hanja: 直指寺) station is a railway station on the Gyeongbu Line in South Korea.

Railway stations in North Gyeongsang Province